Joan Banks (October 30, 1918 – January 18, 1998) was an American film, television, stage, and radio actress (described as "a soapbox queen"), who often appeared in dramas with her husband, Frank Lovejoy.

Early life
Banks attended a school of Russian ballet as a little girl and excelled as a swimmer during high school. Her talent earned her a scholarship to the American Academy of Dramatic Art, and she attended Hunter College.

Career

Radio
Banks first appeared on radio with Walter O'Keefe in 1936, when she was 18. At that same age, she became the first "feminine stooge" for Stoopnagle and Budd on their show. Her other roles on radio programs include:

Film
Banks began her Hollywood career with small roles in such films as Cry Danger (1951) and Washington Story (1952). She became better known in the 1950s and early 1960s for her many appearances as a supporting actress in films such as My Pal Gus.

Television
On March 25, 1958, Banks co-starred with husband Lovejoy in an episode of his Meet McGraw program. In 1972, Banks appeared in the CBS movie Return to Peyton Place.

She made five appearances on Perry Mason, including four roles as the murderer: in 1957, she played Karen Alder in "The Case of the Negligent Nymph"; in 1960, she played Mrs. Joseph Manley in "The Case of the Mythical Monkeys"; in 1961, she played Rhonda Houseman in "The Case of the Left-Handed Liar"; and in 1964, she played Nellie Conway in "The Case of the Woeful Widower". In 1958, she appeared as Clara Hood in the episode, "Fatal Memory," on the TV series "Wanted: Dead or Alive." She also made four appearances on National Velvet, two appearances on Alfred Hitchcock Presents, and single appearances on shows such as Ford Theatre,  I Love Lucy, Private Secretary, Date with the Angels, The Rough Riders, Mr. Adams and Eve, The Many Loves of Dobie Gillis, Bewitched, and again two appearances on Hazel.

On October 2, 1962, Frank Lovejoy died of a heart attack in bed at the couple's New York residence. At the time,  Banks and he were appearing together in a New Jersey stage production of Gore Vidal's play The Best Man, but they had been off the night he was stricken. Banks' career in radio continued after her work in television subsided, and she appeared in 33 episodes of CBS Radio Mystery Theater from 1974 to 1980.

Personal life
Banks married fellow actor Frank Lovejoy, whom she met when both had roles on the radio soap opera This Day Is Ours. The couple had two children, Judy and Steve.

Filmography

References

External links

 
 
 
 

1918 births
1998 deaths
Actresses from West Virginia
American film actresses
American radio actresses
American television actresses
Deaths from lung cancer in California
People from Petersburg, West Virginia
20th-century American actresses